Sarujeh may refer to:
 Sarujeh, East Azerbaijan
 Sarujeh, Razavi Khorasan
 Sarujeh-ye Olya, West Azerbaijan Province
 Sarujeh-ye Sofla, West Azerbaijan Province